A trunk road, trunk highway, or strategic road is a major road, usually connecting two or more cities, ports, airports and other places, which is the recommended route for long-distance and freight traffic. Many trunk roads have segregated lanes in a dual carriageway, or are of motorway standard.

United Kingdom

In the United Kingdom, trunk roads were first defined for Great Britain in the Trunk Roads Act 1936. Thirty major roads were classed as trunk roads, and the minister of transport took direct control of them and the bridges across them. The Trunk Roads Act came into force in England and Wales on 1 April 1937, and in Scotland on 16 May 1937. This development did not extend to Northern Ireland, which has always had a separate system of highway and road traffic law.

At that time,  of British roads were classified as trunk roads. Additional roads have been "trunked", notably in the Trunk Roads Act 1946. Others, like virtually all British motorways, have entered the system as a result of new construction. As of 2004, Great Britain had 7,845 mi (12,625 km) of trunk roads, of which 2,161 mi (3,478 km) were motorways.

Since 1994, trunk roads in England have been managed by National Highways (formerly Highways England, and Highways Agency), while Scotland has had responsibility for its own trunk roads since 1998; these are currently managed by Transport Scotland, created in 2006. The Welsh Government has had responsibility for trunk roads in Wales since its establishment in 1998.

England has , Scotland has  and Wales has  of trunk roads, inclusive of motorways. National Highways publishes a full network map of trunk roads and motorways in England.

Most interurban trunk roads are primary routes, the category of roads recommended for long distance and freight transport. Not all primary routes are trunk roads, the difference being that maintenance of trunk roads is paid for by national government bodies rather than the local councils in whose area they lie. Primary routes are identified by their direction signs, which feature white text on a green background with route numbers in yellow. Trunk roads, like other "A" roads, can be either single- or dual-carriageway.

Historically, trunk roads were listed on maps with a "T" in brackets after their number, to distinguish them from non-trunk parts of the same road, however this suffix is no longer included on current Ordnance Survey maps, which simply distinguish between primary and non-primary "A" roads. A trunk road which has been upgraded to motorway standards may retain its original "A" number, but with an "M" in brackets to denote that motorway regulations apply on it. Long distance examples of this are the A1(M) in England, and the A74(M) in Scotland.

De-trunking
It is possible for roads to be "de-trunked" – for example, when superseded by a motorway following a similar route – in which case they normally become ordinary "A" roads. When a road is de-trunked, signposts are often replaced, and sometimes route numbers are changed, making the original route of the road harder to follow. Roads are formally and legally detrunked by statutory instruments named 'Detrunking (or sometimes De-Trunking) Orders' which include a plan of the route being detrunked. The routes to be detrunked (as set out in detrunking orders) are not always linear sections, but can be split into multiple sections, and span multiple counties.

In England, the government has de-trunked much of the trunk road network since the late 1990s, transferring responsibility to local councils to allow National Highways to concentrate on a selection of core trunk routes, mostly dual carriageways and motorways.

Ireland

In Ireland, major roads were previously classified under an old system as "trunk roads", and had route numbers prefixed by a "T". Connecting roads were classified as 'link roads", and had route numbers prefixed by an "L". Many of these roads had their origins in historic routes, including turnpike roads.

Although a number of old road signs using these route designations may still be encountered, Ireland has adopted a newer classification scheme of national primary and national secondary routes ("N" roads), regional roads ("R" roads), and local roads ("L"-prefixed roads). Local road numbers were previously not signposted, although they are now indicated on signs in many areas of the country.

The current "L"-prefixed local roads are unrelated to the previous "L"-prefixed link road classification.

De-trunking
Some former trunk roads, or sections of former trunk roads, became non-trunk regional roads under the new road numbering system introduced in the 1970s and 1980s. More recently, sections of former national primary routes which have been bypassed by motorways or other road improvement schemes have been downgraded to regional road status.

United States

Though the term "trunk road" is not commonly used in American English, the U.S. Highway and Interstate Highway systems can be considered American trunk highways. However, individual states are responsible for actual highway construction and maintenance, even though the federal government helps fund these activities as long as the states enact certain laws and enforce them (such laws have included the raising of the minimum drinking age and the lowering of speed limits). Each state maintains all of its roads and tries to integrate them into a system appropriate for that state. The states of Michigan, Minnesota, and Wisconsin designate their highways as "state trunklines" or "(state) trunk highways". In many states, highways beyond those that are part of the U.S. Highway and Interstate Highway systems may also serve as trunk highways; these are often numbered and posted as state highways or state routes. Not all state highways and state routes, however, serve this purpose or are constructed to these standards; many in rural areas are simple two-lane roads.

China
Trunk highways in China consist of China National Highways and Expressways of China.

India 
Trunk highways in India consist of national highways, expressways in India, and state highways. The most famous is the Grand Trunk Road.

France

Poland

Sweden 

The most important roads in Sweden are labelled "national trunk road". In 1982, the parliament decided upon which roads were to become national trunk roads. They are considered recommended main roads for long-distance traffic. They were also supposed to be used for movement and transport of heavy military vehicles, ordnance and logistics and during wartime were to be guarded and defended at all odds.

National trunk roads are planned nationally, as opposed to other roads, which are planned locally. They also have a special, slightly larger budget. However, they are not signed in any special way. Therefore, there is no difference in signage, numbering, road standard or map marking from other national roads. Some national roads are only considered trunk for part of their length. National Roads 73 and 75 are both built to motorway standard and have high traffic, but are not considered trunk. European routes are always trunk in Sweden, and are more visible with special numbering.

List of Swedish trunk roads 
E4, Haparanda to Helsingborg
E6, Trelleborg to Svinesund
E10, Kiruna to Luleå
E12, Lycksele to Holmsund
E14, Storlien to Sundsvall
E16, Norwegian border to Gävle
E18, Västerås to Kapellskär
E20, Malmö to Stockholm
E22, Trelleborg to Norrköping
E45, Gothenburg to Karesuando
E65, Malmö to Ystad
, Halmstad to Kalmar
, Halmstad to Mora
, Gothenburg to Västervik
, Jönköping to Söderhamn
, Gävle to Norrköping
, Enköping to Mora

See also
Controlled-access highway
Off-network tactical diversion route
Post road

References

Types of roads

nrm:Câochie